"This is Not" is a song by the heavy metal band Static-X. It is the fifth track and first single from their album Machine. The music video, directed by Atom Rothlein, shows a live performance of the track with the album version played over it. The song was also used in the video game Shaun Palmer's Pro Snowboarder.

Track listing
 "This Is Not" – 2:57
 "...In a Bag" – 4:22

Live single
 "This Is Not" (live) – 3:01
 "Interview with Wayne, Ken, Tripp and Tony (multimedia)
 "This Is Not" (live video) – 3:01

Chart performance

References

2001 singles
Static-X songs
2001 songs
Warner Records singles
Songs written by Tony Campos
Songs written by Ken Jay
Songs written by Wayne Static